Jacqueline Margaret (Jackie) Cumming is a New Zealand professor in the School of Government at Victoria University of Wellington

Academic career
After a BA and MA from the University of Auckland and a Diploma in Health Economics from the University of Tromsø, Cumming completed a PhD at Victoria University of Wellington in 2003 titled Health Services Coverage Regulation: an Evaluation of Policy Options for New Zealand. She later joined the Victoria faculty, rising to professor.

Cumming led the Health Reforms 2001 Research Project at Victoria which assessed the impacts of the New Zealand Public Health and Disability Act 2000 and other health initiatives under the Helen Clark government.

2013 research led by Cumming into regional differences in charges for doctors' visits and prescriptions was widely reported in the New Zealand media.

Cumming has supervised 21 PhD students, accumulated 100 publications and secured over $30 million in research funding.

Selected works
 Primary health organisations, 2003.
 Nursing developments in primary health care, 2001–2007, 2009.

References

External links
 google scholar 
 institutional homepage

Living people
University of Auckland alumni
University of Tromsø alumni
Victoria University of Wellington alumni
Academic staff of the Victoria University of Wellington
New Zealand women academics
New Zealand writers
New Zealand women writers
Year of birth missing (living people)